Buckhorn Corners is an unincorporated community in Buckeye Township, Stephenson County, Illinois, United States. It is based at the intersection of McConnell Road and State Highway 26. Buckhorn Corners is in the Orangeville Community School District.

References

External links
Buckhorn Corners, Illinois Home Town Locator

Unincorporated communities in Stephenson County, Illinois
Unincorporated communities in Illinois